Hilo, Hawaii is home to a number of educational institutions, including 2 post-secondary institutions, the University of Hawaii at Hilo and Hawaii Community College.

In all, there are 8 public elementary schools, 2 public intermediate schools, 2 public high schools and 7 private schools in Hilo.  The public schools are separated into 2 complexes, centered on the high schools.

Hilo complex
Hilo High School 
Hilo Intermediate School 
Ernest Bowen deSilva Elementary School
Haaheo Elementary School
Hilo Union Elementary School
Kapiolani Elementary School
Kaumana Elementary School
Keaukaha Elementary School
Kalanianaole Intermediate School.  While Kalanianaole, and its elementary school, feed into Hilo High, they are not in the CDP, and are not counted in the aforementioned numbers.  
Kalanianaole Elementary School

Waiakea complex
Waiakea Elementary School
Waiakeawaena Elementary School
Waiakea Intermediate School
Waiakea High School

Private schools
E Makaala School
Haili Christian School
Hale Aloha Nazarene School
Kamehameha Schools Hawaii Campus
Mauna Loa School
St Joseph Elementary School
St Joseph Junior/Senior High School

Hilo

Buildings and structures in Hilo, Hawaii
Education in Hilo, Hawaii